Inoki Theopilus Cahyadi (born 3 August 1977) is a German  badminton player. In 2003, he won Italian International tournament in men's doubles event with his partner Agus Sugimin. In 2012, he became a badminton coach at Issy-les-Moulineaux club in France, and in the same year he became the runner-up of Hungarian International tournament as a French badminton player.

References

External links 
 
 
 
 

1977 births
Living people
German male badminton players
French male badminton players